Tom Kerrigan may refer to:

 Tom Kerrigan (Coronation Street), a character on the TV soap opera Coronation Street
 Tom Kerrigan (golfer) (1895–1964), American golfer
 Tom Kerrigan (American football) (1906–1979), American football player